Mark of Zorro (also known as Who's Afraid of Zorro and They Call Him Zorro... Is He?) is a 1975 Italian adventure comedy film directed by Franco Lo Cascio.

Plot

Cast 

 George Hilton: Felipe Mackintosh / Zorro
 Lionel Stander: Father Donato
 Charo López: Rosita Florenda
 Rodolfo Licari: Don Manuel La Paz
 Antonio Pica: Major De Colignac
 Gino Pagnani: Betrunkener

See also     
 List of Italian films of 1975

References

External links

1975 films
1970s adventure comedy films
1970s Western (genre) comedy films
Italian adventure comedy films
Zorro films
Spaghetti Western films
1975 comedy films
Films based on works by Johnston McCulley
1970s American films
1970s Italian films